Ran Urabe (卜部蘭, born 16 June 1995) is a Japanese athlete. She competed in the women's 1500 metres event at the 2020 Summer Olympics.

References

External links
 

1995 births
Living people
Japanese female middle-distance runners
Athletes (track and field) at the 2020 Summer Olympics
Olympic athletes of Japan
Athletes from Tokyo
20th-century Japanese women
21st-century Japanese women